Chris or Christopher Robinson may refer to:

Entertainment
 Christopher Robinson (musician) (born 1936), former Director of the Music, Choir of St John's College, Cambridge
 Chris Robinson (actor) (born 1938), soap opera actor
 Chris Robinson (radio personality) (born 1956), Canadian travel writer and radio broadcaster
 Chris Robinson (writer) (born 1967), Canadian writer, animation historian and director of the Ottawa International Animation Festival
 Chris Robinson (singer) (born 1966), American rock singer for the Black Crowes
 Chris Robinson (director), music video director

Government
 Sir Christopher Robinson (English judge) (1766–1833), admiralty lawyer, legal writer and MP
 Christopher Robinson (Upper Canada politician) (1763–1798), soldier, lawyer and political figure in Upper Canada
 Christopher Robinson (Rhode Island politician) (1806–1889), U.S. Representative and Minister to Peru
 Christopher Robinson (Virginia politician) (1645–1693), planter and politician in the colony of Virginia
 Christopher Robinson (Irish  judge) (1712–1787), Irish lawyer,  judge and bibliophile
 Christopher T. Robinson, American diplomat

Other
 Christopher Robinson (priest) (died 1598), English Catholic priest and martyr, beatified in 1987
 Christopher Robinson (bishop) (1903–1988), Anglican bishop in India
 Christopher Robinson (Canadian lawyer) (1828–1905), Canadian lawyer and prosecutor

Sports
 Chris Robinson (baseball) (born 1984), professional baseball player
 Chris Robinson (basketball) (born 1974), basketball player